Leopold Ivanovych Taburyanskyi (born 1940) is a Ukrainian politician.

Life before politics

Taburyanskyi was born July 22, 1940, in Kryvyi Rih. In 1958 he graduated from the Dnipropetrovsk Industrial College, after which he was drafted to the army. From 1962 Taburyanskyi worked at mines Comintern and Kirov. Soon after being excluded from the Communist Party  (1985) he became the president of the syndicate "Olimp" and the Association of Farms "Son".

Political life

On March 4, 1990, Taburyanskyi was elected with 64.05% votes (out of 6 candidates) as a member of parliament of Ukrainian SSR from an election district in the city of Dnipropetrovsk where he was a member of the opposition faction People's Council (Narodna Rada). On September 27, 1991, he established the People's Party of Ukraine (1991–93) and in December 1991 participated in the presidential elections where he gathered some 182,713 votes placing last (0.57%).

Taburyanskyi was not able to be reelected to the Verkhovna Rada in 1994. The same year he lost his son under mysterious circumstances which implied that his son committed suicide. Taburyanskyi tried to be reelected in 1998, however - was not successful. In 2000-01 he participated in the protest Ukraine without Kuchma and was one of those who undersigned the declaration of the Civil Committee in protection of Constitution. In 2002 Taburyanskyi was once again unsuccessful to be reelected to the parliament.

References

External links
 Official site of the parliament
 Official site of the Electoral Committee

1940 births
Living people
Politicians from Kryvyi Rih
First convocation members of the Verkhovna Rada
Candidates in the 1991 Ukrainian presidential election
Expelled members of the Communist Party of the Soviet Union
Independent politicians in Ukraine